American Pie Presents: Girls' Rules is a 2020 American straight-to-DVD sex comedy film directed by Mike Elliott. It is the fifth installment of the American Pie Presents film series, a spin-off of the American Pie franchise and the ninth overall installment. It is also the first film in the franchise to neither feature Eugene Levy nor contain any nudity. The film serves as a standalone sequel, revolving around Steve Stifler's cousin Stephanie (Lizze Broadway) and her friends.

The film was released on demand and DVD on October 6, 2020, by Universal Pictures. It was released on Blu-ray on September 7, 2021.

Plot 
Now that it is their senior year, four young friends named Annie, Kayla, Michelle and Stephanie band together to get what they want.

Annie is trying to lose her virginity to her boyfriend. Stephanie is a confident lacrosse player who is blackmailing her school’s perverted principal into retiring by recording him being chained up and whipped by her. Kayla is insecure about her boyfriend Tim cheating and constantly goes through his phone asking if she is the best girlfriend he has ever had. Michelle is a sex toy expert who prides herself on her knowledge. 

They all make a pact to get what they need this year. Along comes Grant, a handsome new guy in school. He meets Michelle first as she is rushing to class, as she is distracted by the sight of him, she runs into a door and he helps her up.

Tim breaks up with Kayla and as Grant witnesses this, he offers help in making her ex jealous. Stephanie is playing lacrosse and meets Grant by knocking him to the ground during a play.

Michelle takes Annie to a sex shop to buy her first toy, a vibrating set of panties. Annie uses it later that day while having phone sex with her boyfriend. Grant and his mother Ellen come over to introduce themselves, especially Ellen to Annie’s single father Kevin, who tells Grant to go upstairs and meet his daughter.

Michelle and Stephanie end up liking Grant and employ ways to win his affection. Michelle, playing the damsel in distress trips and falls into a locker in front of him. He takes her to the nurse and Oliver, the principal's assistant, a nerdy boy who has a crush on her, helps out. Stephanie goes to Grant's friend Emmett (her old friend who she had a falling out with) and asks for his help, giving him $100.

Annie runs into Grant in the library and they team up to study and slowly start falling for each other. Kayla and Tim start having sex clandestinely. Stephanie and Emmett spend more and more time together to help her win over Grant and start falling for each other. Things come to a head at Ellen’s house party when the girls realize they all know and have crushes on Grant. 

Grant says he has a crush on Annie and they kiss. She feels guilty and goes to see her boyfriend Jason at college and catches him getting a blowjob from a girl. Initially angry, she feels relief because she realizes she has feelings for Grant.

Ellen helps Michelle realize that Oliver is the perfect guy for her as he also has a love of John F. Kennedy and when doing an imitation of his speech she realizes she likes him. They all go to a party thrown by Stephanie in an attempt to get together with Grant. Realizing that Grant likes Annie they call off the pact. A fight breaks out when Stephanie gets called a slut and Emmett defends her, which then causes Stephanie to punch the assailant and throw him out. Emmett and Stephanie kiss, realizing the whole time they had feelings for each other. Kayla and Tim get back together. Michelle and Oliver end up together. 

Jason shows up and inaccurately describes the girls' pact to Grant about the pact, who leaves as he feels used. The girls all go to the pajama prom together and help Annie win back Grant. He shows up and they kiss. Their friends set up a tent on the football field so Annie can finally lose her virginity. They all end up having sex with their respective partners.

Cast

 Madison Pettis as Annie
 Lizze Broadway as Stephanie Stifler
 Piper Curda as Kayla
 Natasha Behnam as Michelle
 Darren Barnet as Grant
 Zachary Gordon as Emmett
 Camaron Engels as Tim
 Zayne Emory as Jason
 Christian Valderrama as Oliver
 Sara Rue as Ellen
 Ed Quinn as Kevin
 Danny Trejo as Janitor Steve Garcia
 Lucas Adams as McCormick
 Patricia Elliott as MeePaw
 Barry Bostwick as PeePaw
 Rasheda Crockett as Rose
 Tatiana DeMaria as Lead Singer

Development 
After the success of American Pie Presents: The Book of Love, writer David H. Steinberg was hired in 2010 to write the next movie in the series entitled American Pie Presents: East Great Falls centered around four male students at East Great Falls High School who all fall in love with the same female student. Universal Studios hired new writers starting in 2017 to flip the genders of all the characters.

Reception
On Rotten Tomatoes, the film has an approval rating of  based on reviews from  critics.

Robyn Bahr of The Hollywood Reporter wrote, "Dashed together by a male director, two male screenwriters and a half-male producing team, the film appears to be the cinematic equivalent of two straight girls making out at a party for some bro's attention."
Teo Bugbee of The New York Times wrote, "The original American Pie was tasteless; this version is flavorless."

References

External links
 

American Pie (film series)
2020 films
2020 comedy films
2020 direct-to-video films
2020 independent films
2020s coming-of-age comedy films
2020s sex comedy films
2020s teen comedy films
American coming-of-age comedy films
American independent films
American sex comedy films
American teen comedy films
Direct-to-video comedy films
Direct-to-video sequel films
2020s English-language films
Films about virginity
Films directed by Mike Elliott
Films produced by Mike Elliott
Teen sex comedy films
Universal Pictures direct-to-video films
2020s American films
English-language comedy films